Independence Day is a 2000 Indian action drama film shot in Tamil and Kannada, directed by A. R. Ramesh. The film stars Sai Kumar, Arun Pandian, Roja and Ranjitha.  Music for the film was composed by Deva and the film opened to mixed reviews in August 2000.

Cast
 Sai Kumar
 Arun Pandian
 Roja
 Ranjitha
 Rockline Venkatesh
 Anandaraj
 Chandrasekhar
 Vinaya Prasad
 Mukhyamantri Chandru
 Alphonsa
Pandu
Baby Jennifer

Production
The film was launched in 1997 as a bilingual and progressed slowly through production, having a delayed release. A Telugu version was also considered in 1998, but the venture was later dubbed into the language.

Release
The film had a delayed release in Tamil and Kannada during August 2000, and performed poorly at the box office. The failure of the film led to complications in the release of the Telugu film, Badrinath (2011), as the distributor Ramu claimed that the producer Madhusudhan Reddy had breached his trust during the release of Independence Day (2000).

Soundtrack
The film's soundtrack was composed by Deva.

References

2000 films
2000s Tamil-language films
Indian multilingual films
2000s Kannada-language films
Indian action drama films
Films scored by Deva (composer)
2000 action drama films
2000 multilingual films
Films directed by A. R. Ramesh